James Raymond Jordan Sr. (July 31, 1936 – July 23, 1993) was the father of former basketball player Michael Jordan, and was the grandfather of former basketball players Jeffrey Jordan and Marcus Jordan.

Life
James Jordan Sr. was born in Wallace, North Carolina, on July 31, 1936. While attending Charity High School, he met Deloris Peoples (born September 1941). The two began dating and remained together for the next three years. Upon graduation, Jordan Sr. joined the Air Force and was stationed in San Antonio, Texas. In 1956, he transferred to a base in Virginia and married Peoples shortly thereafter. Their first child, son James Ronald "Ronnie" Jr., was born the following year. Jordan Sr. left the Air Force and got a job at a textile mill in Wallace. The Jordans had two more children: daughter Deloris, and a son, Larry.

In 1963, the Jordans left their children with Jordan Sr.'s mother and moved to Brooklyn so that he could receive mechanic's training on the G.I. Bill. He studied airplane hydraulics, while Peoples found work at a bank. While living in Brooklyn, the Jordans had another child, son Michael. As crime began to increase in Brooklyn in the 1960s, the Jordans moved back to North Carolina to raise their children in a safer environment. Upon completing his 18 months' training, Jordan Sr. and his family moved to Wilmington, North Carolina. It was there that the couple's fifth child, Roslyn, was born.

A lifelong basketball fan, Jordan Sr. played a large role in inspiring his son Michael to become an athlete and traveled the United States to follow his son's career, first at the University of North Carolina and then with the Chicago Bulls.

Nonetheless, Jordan Sr. was also a very big baseball fan, having gone semi-pro himself. In his autobiography and in interviews throughout his career, son Michael recounted that it was his father's vision that he become a baseball star. Baseball was, in fact, the first sport Jordan Sr. had taught him to play. Michael recounted that this was a major factor in his decision to try baseball after his first retirement from the NBA.

In her memoir In My Family's Shadow, Jordan Sr.'s daughter Deloris accused him of sexually molesting her between the ages of 8 and 16.

Death
On July 23, 1993, while returning home after spending the day playing golf, Jordan Sr. pulled over on US Highway 74 just south of Lumberton, North Carolina, to take a nap. Daniel Andre Green and Larry Martin Demery spotted the car Michael had recently purchased for him (a red Lexus SC400 with the North Carolina license plate that read "UNC0023"). Green shot Jordan to death while he slept in his car and then stole the vehicle. His body was found on August 3 in a swamp in McColl, South Carolina. As his body was in a state of extreme decomposition, Jordan Sr. was not identified until August 13 with the help of dental records provided by the family dentist; his body had previously been cremated by the coroner due to lack of storage space, but his jaw and hands were preserved for identification.

After going through Jordan Sr.'s belongings, Green and Demery realized that Jordan Sr. was the father of Michael Jordan. They had taken other items from the car, including two NBA championship rings given to Jordan Sr. by his son. Green and Demery made several calls from Jordan Sr.'s cell phone and as a result were immediately captured. After their arrest, Demery said that they had planned only to tie up their victim and that Green pulled the trigger for no reason. Both were convicted and sentenced to life imprisonment. The accusation was based only on Demery's testimony; Green did not testify. Defense counsel Woodberry Bowen said Demery had everything to gain by lying that Green was the triggerman, and that Green's testimony put Demery closer than he earlier admitted. James Jordan Sr. was buried at Rockfish AME Church in Teachey, North Carolina, on August 15, 1993.

In 2010, it was revealed the case was one of nearly 200 that were in review after the North Carolina State Bureau of Investigation found that laboratory technicians mishandled or omitted evidence. However, the Jordan case was later removed from the list.

On July 23, 2018, Christine Mumma, executive director of the Center on Actual Innocence, said evidence showed Green did not commit the murder. Green claimed Demery merely asked him for help disposing of the body. On August 3, 2018, Superior Court Judge Winston Gilchrist ruled on several motions and set a December date for a hearing. On December 5, 2018, Mumma asked Gilchrist to allow a closer look at evidence that could lead to a new trial, and Gilchrist said he would rule later. Gilchrist said on March 6, 2019, that he would not grant Green a hearing, and Mumma said she would appeal.

In August 2020, Demery was approved for parole; he was scheduled for release on August 6, 2023.  In December of 2021, it was announced that the state of North Carolina had terminated his scheduled parole release.

References

External links

1936 births
1993 deaths
1993 murders in the United States
American murder victims
Burials in North Carolina
Deaths by firearm in North Carolina
Male murder victims
Murdered African-American people
People from Wallace, North Carolina
People from Wilmington, North Carolina
People murdered in North Carolina
United States Air Force officers